Osmunda × intermedia is a semifertile hybrid between Osmunda japonica and Osmunda lancea.

References

Osmunda intermedia
Hybrid plants
Ferns of Asia